Elisabeth Cummings (born 1934, Brisbane) is an Australian artist known for her large abstract paintings and printmaking. She has won numerous awards including Fleurieu Art Prize, The Portia Geach Portrait Prize, The Mosman Art Prize, and The Tattersalls Art Prize. Her work is owned in permanent collections across Australia including Artbank, The Queensland Art Gallery, The Gold Coast City Art Gallery and the Art Gallery of New South Wales. She is notable for receiving recognition later in her career, considered by the Australian Art Collector as one of the 50 most collectible Australian Artists.

Biography

Early life 
Elisabeth Cummings was born on 3 June 1934 in Brisbane, Queensland. During the Second World War Cumming’s family evacuated Brisbane and lived in the country before returning to live in Alderley. The family home in Alderley was surrounded by bushlands. The Cummings family owned a holiday home at Currumbin on the Gold Coast where Cummings, as a child, would paint watercolour landscapes. Currumbin and the Australian bush are now regular subjects in her landscape paintings. Cummings and her brother, Malcolm, would draw still lifes constructed by their mother, who was a primary school teacher, until her father said "let the kids draw what they want.” Cummings’ father, Robert Cummings, was an architect, a Professor of Architecture at the University of Queensland, an art collector and trustee of the Queensland Art Gallery. Cummings would regularly attend paint workshops run by Australian Artist Vida Lahey at the Queensland Art Gallery.

Education 
During her youth, the Cummings home was visited frequently by artists including Donald Friend, and Len and Kathleen Shillam. Cummings initially wanted to pursue architectural training but decided to enroll in art school after meeting and painting with Margaret Cilento. She studied at the National Art School, then known as East Sydney Technical College, from 1953 to 1957 where she was educated by artists Douglas Dundas, Wallace Thornton, Dorothy Thornhill, Godfrey Miller and Ralph Balson. At art school, Cummings was exposed to the work of fellow young Australian artists which she found to be formative to her practice. The artists Cummings cites as influential during this period include Grace Cossington Smith, Margaret Preston, Fred Williams, Russell Drysdale, Sydney Nolan, John Olsen and Jimmy Rose.

In 1958 Cummings received the NSW Traveling Art Scholarship and in 1960 the Dyason Bequest, both of which facilitated her travel through Europe for the next decade. In 1961 she studied at Kokoschka’s School of Vision run by Oskar Kokoschka in Salzburg, Austria before travelling to Florence, Italy. She spent the next 10 years living and studying between Italy and Paris. In Florence she shared a villa with other artists, where she met her husband, fellow painting student Jamie Barker. Cumming’s work was informed by European and Australian predecessors such as Pierre Bonnard, Henri Matisse, Paul Cézanne, Pablo Picasso, Édouard Vuillard and Margaret Olley. In 1968, she returned to Australia and settled in Sydney. In 1969 she started teaching at East Sydney Technical College on a part-time basis.

Work 
Elisabeth Cummings is a multi-disciplinary artist and celebrated colourist painter, working within painting, printmaking, drawing and ceramics. Inspired by the Australian bush, and a sense of place and memory, which are themes in Cumming’s semi-abstract landscapes, interiors and still life paintings. Cumming’s starts her paintings by drawing multiple quick sketches of the scene which form the basis for her final full-sized work. John McDonald describes her painting style as "[t]hick, heavily worked, painterly surfaces with complex marks and intense colour". Notable paintings from Cummings body of work include interiors, Journey Through The Studio painted in 2004 and Inside The Yellow Room, 2005. Her landscape paintings include Arkaroola landscape, 2005, which was rejected from the Wynne Prize, Edge of the Simpson Desert, 2011 and Wynne Prize finalist Monaro Shadow and Light, 2015.

Early work 
Elisabeth Cummings worked part-time as an art teacher from 1969 to 2001 at multiple art colleges including the City Art Institute, Sydney (1975 to 1987) and the National Art School of Sydney. She continued painting independently during this time, winning awards such as the 1974 Grafton Prize and the 1977 Landscape and Still Life Prizes, RAS. Elisabeth Cummings has lived and worked at her Wedderburn studio residence since 1976.

Later work 
Elisabeth Cummings has been called ‘The Invisible Woman of Australian Art’ as she worked quietly and independently in her studio for 43 years with limited recognition. Cummings was unaffected by the lack of coverage of her work, stating "I like anonymity." She held her first Retrospective Exhibition "Elisabeth Cummings 65-96" at age 62 in Campbelltown Art Gallery, New South Wales. In 2012 Cummings exhibited her second Retrospective ‘Luminous: Survey Exhibition Landscapes of Elizabeth Cummings’ at the SH Ervin, Observatory Hill, Sydney. Now, Elisabeth Cumming’s works are a part of many major and regional Australian public collections including the National Gallery of Australia; the Art Gallery of New South Wales; The Queensland Art Gallery and Campbelltown Arts Centre, Sydney. In 2011 Elisabeth Cummings, at age 77, was awarded the Order of Australia Medal in recognition for her services to the visual arts in Australia. In 2018 Cummings was the subject of Noel Thurgate’s portrait Elisabeth Cummings in her studio at Wedderburn, 1974 and 2018, which was a finalist for the 2018 Archibald Portraiture Prize.

Cummings is a frequent traveler and has participated in international and national artist residencies and exhibitions. In 2014, at age 81, participated in an artist residency and exhibition at The Nock Art Foundation in Hong Kong. In the same year Cummings, in a group of nine Australian artists, held a group exhibition at the Waiheke Arts Centre during their residency in Waiheke, New Zealand. Cummings was involved in the travelling exhibition YOUR FRIEND THE ENEMY along with fifteen Australian and New Zealand Artists. The artists were invited to Gallipoli, Turkey to paint the shores of Anzac Cove.

Printmaking 
In 2001 Cummings expanded into printmaking, specifically etching. She became involved in printmaking through a workshop with Michael Kempson at Cicada Press, a studio associated with UNSW Art & Design in Sydney. Cummings participated in a program whereby artists print with the assistance of students. Other notable participants include Reg Mombassa and Euan Macleod. Cummings has since visited Cicada Press weekly to work with Kempson. Her print work explores similar concerns to her painting, primarily landscape and interiors. Cummings also created monoprints through Whaling Road Studios. The Cruthers Collection of Women's Art at the University of Western Australia hold three lithographs, Studio, 1986, Dappled bush, 1995 and Windy bush, 1995, and a silkscreen print Billabong, 1999 by Cummings.  In 2017 Cummings donated a comprehensive archival collection of 85 of her prints and etchings to the New England Regional Art Museum.

Ceramics 
Cummings has also explored ceramics and sculpture in the form of small-scale interior sets with figures crafted in clay. These were created together with Lino Alvarez. Cummings has also made small scale figurative sculptures out of bronze. In 2012 she collaborated with Louise Boscacci to make translucent porcelain plates and platters on which Cummings painted. The flat shape of the plates was chosen to reflect the salt encrusted clay pans of northern Queensland. The project "Cicada Waterfall" was named for the cicadas that can be heard in the bush at Cummings Wedderburn home. These pieces were exhibited in 2014 at King Street Gallery in Sydney as part of Cummings exhibition Elisabeth Cummings: A Still Life.

Wedderburn 
In 1970, Cummings began camping in a tent on bushland land owned by Barbara and Nick Romalis at Wedderburn outside Sydney. Ten acres of land was gifted to Cummings by the Romalis to be used for the building of an art studio. Cummings was joined by artists John Peart, Roy Jackson, Joan Brassil, Suzanne Archer and David Fairbairn. The group then purchased another 15 acres. The move to Wedderburn coincided with a move towards gestural abstraction in her paintings, with Cummings privileging the painting process over the subject matter. Both Cummings and Peart have been involved in campaigns to protect the environment of Wedderburn from development. In 1994 Cummings a small studio was destroyed by bushfires, along with significant amounts of work. Fellow long time resident John Peart died as the result of smoke inhalation as the result of the fire. Following the fire, Cummings built a larger studio attached to her mud brick house on the land. Her 2001 painting After the Fire, Wedderburn depicts the aftermath of the fires.

Collections 

 Artbank, Australia
 Art Gallery of New South Wales, NSW
 The Australia Club, NSW
 Bathurst Regional Art Gallery, NSW
 Campbelltown City Bicentennial Art Gallery, NSW
 Charles Sturt University, Wagga Wagga, NSW
 Gold Coast City Art Gallery, QLD
 College of Fine Arts, University of NSW, Sydney, NSW
 Cruthers Collection of Women’s Art, The University of Western Australia, WA
 The Drill Hall, ANU, ACT
 Grafton Regional Art Gallery, NSW
 The Hawkesbury City Art Collection, NSW
 Jackson Smith Solicitors, NSW
 James Cook University, Townsville, QLD
 Kedumba Drawing Collection
 Kelvin Grove Teachers College, Brisbane, QLD
 Lismore Regional Art Gallery, NSW
 Long Gallery & Art Collection, University of Wollongong, NSW
 Macquarie Bank
 Manly Art Gallery and Museum, NSW
 Maroondah Regional Gallery, Vic.
 Museum of Brisbane, QLD
 Mosman Art Gallery, NSW
 National Gallery of Australia, ACT
 Newcastle Region Art Gallery, NSW
 New England Regional Art Museum, NSW
 Ormond College, Vic.
 Outback Arts Inc, QLD
 Queensland Art Gallery, Brisbane, QLD
 Queensland College of Art, Griffith University, Brisbane, QLD
 The Redcliffe City Art Gallery, QLD
 Rockhampton Art Gallery, QLD
 Shoalhaven City Arts Centre, NSW
 State Gallery of NSW
 Tamworth, NSW
 University of Queensland Art Museum, Brisbane, QLD    
 Waiheke Art Gallery, NZ

Solo exhibitions 

 2014 A Still Life, King Street Gallery on William, Sydney
 2013 Elisabeth Cummings [a selection of works 1982-2013], King Street Gallery on William
 2012 Luminous: Survey Exhibition Landscapes of Elisabeth Cummings [curated by Jane Watters], SH Ervin, Observatory Hill, Sydney Monotypes: Interiors, King Street Gallery on William
 2011 Elisabeth Cummings, New Paintings, King Street Gallery on William
 2010 Paper Trail: 30 Years, King Street Gallery on William
 2008 New Paintings, King Street Gallery on William
 2007 Monotypes, King Street Gallery on Burton, Sydney
 2006 new paintings, King Street Gallery on Burton, Sydney
 2005 Chapman Gallery, Canberra
 2004 Painting, King Street Gallery on Burton, Sydney
 2003 Painting, King Street Gallery at Span Galleries, Melbourne paintings, Pandanus Art, Currumbin Beach, Qld
 2002 New Paintings, King Street Gallery on Burton, Sydney Elisabeth Cummings & Clara Hali, Orange Regional Gallery, NSW
 2001 Paintings and Prints, Chapman Gallery, ACT Collaborative Pots, (Barbara Romalis & Elisabeth Cummings), Chapman Gallery
 2000 recent work, King Street Gallery on Burton Works on Paper, Sturt Gallery, Mittagong, NSW
 1998 recent work, King Street gallery on Burton
 1997 Survey Show (1965-1995), Gold Coast City Art Gallery, Qld, Chapman Gallery, Canberra
 1996 Survey Show (1965-1995), Campbelltown City Bicentennial Art Gallery, NSW recent paintings, King Street Gallery on Burton Sturt Gallery, Mittagong, NSW
 1994 New Work, King Street Gallery on Burton
 1992 Paintings, King Street Gallery on Burton, Schubert Art Gallery, Queensland
 1991 Budds Beach Gallery, Gold Coast, Queensland
 1990 Victor Mace Fine Art Gallery, Brisbane
 1989 Painters Gallery, Sydney

Awards and art residencies 

 2014 Waiheke Community Art Gallery, New Zealand
 2014 The Nock Art Foundations, Hong Kong
 2011 Awarded OAM in recognition of services to the visual arts in Australia
 2005–present Artist in residence, COFA printmaking department, UNSW, Sydney
 2000 Fleurier Prize for Landscape, S.A.
 1996 Mosman Art Prize, NSW
 1995 Camden Art Prize, NSW
 1992 Tattersall's Club Art Prize, Qld
 1991 Fishers Ghost Prize, Campbelltown City Bicentennial Art Gallery
 1989 Gold Coast Purchase Prize, Qld
 1988 REIQ Bicentennial Art Award, Qld
 1987 Open Section, Camden Art Prize Faber Castell Drawing Prize
 1984 Mervyn Horton Memorial Prize, Berrima, NSW Camden Purchase Prize, NSW Friends of the Campbelltown Art Gallery Purchase
 1983 Lane Cove Purchase Prize, NSW
 1982 Lane Cove Purchase Prize, NSW
 1981 Macquarie Towns Purchase Prize, NSW
 1979 Peter Stuyvesant Prize, Shoalhaven Fishers Ghost Prize, Campbelltown City Hall Gosford Purchase Prize, NSW
 1978 Gold Coast Purchase Prize
 1977 Landscape and Still Life Prizes, RAS, Sydney Lismore Prize, NSW Fishers Ghost Prize, Campbelltown City Hall
 1976 Drummoyne Prize, NSW
 1974 Grafton Prize, NSW
 1972 Human Image Prize, RAS, Sydney Cheltenham Prize, NSW Portia Geach Portrait Prize, Sydney
 1971 Gold Coast Purchase Prize, QLD
 1960 Dyason Bequest
 1958 NSW Travelling Art Scholarship
 1957 Le Gay Brereton Prize for Drawing

Selected exhibition catalogues 

 Elisabeth Cummings Journeys, 6 November – 1 December 2018, King Street Gallery, Sydney
 Raw Wedderburn, 24 June – 5 August 2018, Delmar Gallery, Sydney 
 Elisabeth Cummings: New Paintings, 2015, King Street Gallery, Sydney
 Country and Western: landscape re-imagined, 24 July – 20 September 2015, perc Tucker Regional Gallery, Townsville 
 Your Friend the Enemy, 10 April – 17 May 2015, Drill Hall Gallery, Canberra  
 Elisabeth Cummings: A Still Life, 2014, King Street Gallery, Sydney 
 Elisabeth Cummings [a selection of works from 1984-2013], King Street Gallery, Sydney
 Monotypes: Interiors, 2012, King Street Gallery, Sydney
 Elisabeth Cummings, 2011, King Street Gallery, Sydney
 Paper Trail: 30 Years, 2010, King Street Gallery, Sydney 
 Monotypes, 10 January – 3 February 2007, King Street Gallery, Sydney

References

Further reading 

 M. Dingle & J. McDonald, Elisabeth Cummings : Landscapes and Interiors, Shoalhaven City Arts Centre, 2014. .
 J.McDonald & T. Maloon, Elisabeth Cummings, Drill Hall Gallery Publishing, 2017. .

External links 
 Elisabeth Cummings work in the collection of the Art Gallery of New South Wales
 Elisabeth Cummings at King Street Gallery
 Elisabeth Cummings Monograph at The National Trust
 Elisabeth Cummings at QAGOMA Store
 Elisabeth Cummings in the collection of the National Gallery of Australia
 Elisabeth Cummings Interview with Peter Pinson
 Elisabeth Cummings Interview with Leo Robba

1934 births
Living people
20th-century Australian women artists
20th-century Australian artists
21st-century Australian women artists
21st-century Australian artists
Australian women painters
People from Brisbane
National Art School alumni